Parham Maghsoodloo (born 11 August 2000) is an Iranian chess grandmaster. He was awarded the title of Grandmaster by FIDE in 2016. Maghsoodloo is a three-time Iranian national champion and became the World Junior Chess Champion in 2018.

Early life and chess career
Maghsoodloo was born in 2000 in Gonbad-e Kavus. He played in the 2015 FIDE World Cup, where he was defeated in the first round by Wesley So. The following year, Maghsoodloo was awarded the titles of International Master and Grandmaster by FIDE, and represented his nation at the 42nd Chess Olympiad. He won the Iranian Chess Championship in 2017, 2018 and 2021. Also in 2018, he won the World Junior Chess Championship with a game in hand, finishing with a score of 9½/11, a point ahead of his nearest competitors. His  was 2823.

Maghsoodloo competed in the Tata Steel Challengers in January 2019, placing eighth with a score of 7/13 (+4–3=6).

References

External links 
 
 
 
 

2000 births
Living people
Chess grandmasters
Iranian chess players
People from Gonbad-e Qabus
World Junior Chess Champions